Seán Binder (born 1996) is a German-born human rights activist and certified rescue diver who has spent most of his life in Ireland. The son of a refugee father from Vietnam and a German mother, he grew up in Ireland and later studied at universities in Dublin and London. From 2017 to 2018, he volunteered with an humanitarian non-governmental organization on Lesbos island, Greece, assisting refugees arriving in small boats from the nearby Turkish coast. 

Along with Syrian refugee and human rights activist Sarah Mardini, he was arrested in 2018 and accused by Greek authorities of espionage, aiding illegal immigration and belonging to a criminal organization. These charges have been refuted by human rights organizations such as Amnesty International, denouncing the accusations against Mardini and other humanitarian workers as criminalization of humanitarian acts.

Early life and education 
Binder was born in Germany and moved with his German mother to Castlegregory, a small village on the Western coast of County Kerry, Ireland, at age five. He graduated in political science, economics, sociology and philosophy from Trinity College, Dublin, and also obtained a Master's degree in International Relations at the London School of Economics. Having focussed on conflict management during his studies, he decided to work as a volunteer with a Greek  to get practical experience before finding a job. Binder is the son of a German mother and a Vietnamese father, who was a refugee from Vietnam when he met his future wife. This family history has been quoted as one reason for Binder's understanding and empathy with refugees.

Activism for refugees and legal accusations 

In 2017, Bender travelled to Lesbos, a Greek island about 11 km off the Turkish coastline, to volunteer as a lifeguard with Emergency Response Centre International (ERCI), a registered Greek humanitarian NGO for refugees that cooperated with Frontex, the EU’s border management agency, and Greek border authorities. ERCI provided humanitarian aid and organized search-and-rescue operations in the Mediterranean Sea between 2016 and 2018. Further, ERCI had been operating a medical centre in Moria refugee camp, described by Human Rights Watch and other organizations as an "open air prison".

During the 2015 European migrant crisis, Lesbos had become a key entry point for refugees coming from Turkey into the European Union, with approximately 5,000 migrants and refugees, mostly fleeing the civil war in Syria, landing on the island’s beaches per day. 

At ERCI, Binder met fellow volunteer Sarah Mardini, a Syrian refugee who had fled from her home country in 2015 via Turkey on a dinghy and found refuge first at Lesbos and later political asylum in Germany. Both of them were assisting newly arrived refugees and used their skills as trained swimmers as part of ERCI until 2018. In February 2018 Binder and another member of ERCI were busy on a routine shift, when police arrived and arrested the two volunteers. Released without charge, Binder continued his former activities.

On 21 August 2018, Sarah Mardini was arrested on Lesbos airport, when she intended to return to Germany. The same day, Binder went to the police station to meet with Mardini and was arrested himself. A third member of the NGO, Nassos Karakitsos was arrested shortly afterwards. Binder and Mardini were handcuffed and taken to a courthouse on Lesbos Island.

According to a report in The Guardian, they and two other NGO members were subsequently detained in pre-trial detention in Athens’ high-security Korydallos prison for 106 days. After more than three months in prison, Binder and Mardini were released on 5,000 Euro bail and could leave Greece. Mardini, Binder and further Greek activists for refugees were accused of being members of a criminal organization, human trafficking, money laundering and fraud by Greek authorities. About his time in prison, Binder later said:

Court proceedings 
The defendants' lawyers said the Greek authorities failed to produce concrete evidence in support of the accusations. If ultimately convicted, the accused could be sentenced to 25 years in prison. Apart from the 24 former members of ERCI, a number of other humanitarian workers have been facing prosecution in Greece, similar to what happened in Italy, where providing aid to migrants has also been criminalised.

On 18 November 2021, the Mytilene Misdemeanor Court in Lesbos adjourned the legal proceedings against 24 members of ERCI, including Mardini and Binder, "due to lack of jurisdiction of the court" and referred the case to a higher court. On 18 November 2022, Binder, Mardini and Greek fellow defendant Nassos Karakitsos attended their court summons at the first instance court, and declared that they had nothing to add to their earlier statements. Their next trial was set to begin on 10 January 2023, with the accused facing charges classified as misdemeanor crimes, while the felony charges have not been concluded.

The trial of the 24 rescuers, including Binder and Mardini, began on 10 January 2023. On the following 13 January, the court ruled that the charges of espionage against them and the other defendants were at least partially inadmissible, thus following objections by their lawyers. Among other objections, these were the court's initial failure to translate documents for the foreign defendants into a language they could understand as well as faulty documentation of some of the charges. However, the charges of human trafficking remained and the defendants must continue to live in insecurity pending a second trial. According to a report in the German weekly Die Zeit, the verdict was not a complete acquittal for Mardini, Binder and the other defendants, but at least an intermediate win, and also a political signal in a procedure that a report by the European Parliament had called the 'currently largest case of criminalizing solidarity in Europe'. 

After more than four years of protracted legal procedures by the Greek authorities and personal psychological stress and uncertainty after his first arrest, Binder said he wanted an immediate further trial, in order for him to answer all the felony charges and clear his name. Following the acquittal of the charge of espionage, Binder commented to journalists outside the courtroom:

Statements by international human rights organizations 
Mary Lawlor, UN Special Rapporteur on the Situation of Human Rights Defenders, criticized the Greek authorities' refusal to allow Mardini to be present at the November 2021 court session and said "The fact that authorities have spent more than three years investigating the case has been a deterrent to civil society working for migrant rights in Greece." With regard to the accusations against Mardini and Binder, she further said: "To what have we come that we go against people who are offering solidarity? A guilty verdict for Ms. Mardini and Mr. Binder would be a dark day for Greece, and a dark day for human rights in Europe."

Giorgos Kosmopoulos, Senior Campaigner on Migration for Amnesty International was quoted as follows: "These trumped-up charges are farcical and should never have resulted in Sarah and Seán appearing in court. Today’s adjournment means that having already waited over three years, this ordeal will continue to drag on for Sarah and Seán, leaving them in limbo. We call for the Greek authorities to uphold their human rights obligations, and drop the charges against Sarah and Seán."

See also 

 2015 European migrant crisis
 Frontex - controversies

References

External links 

 Video of interview with Seàn Binder on YouTube
 Video about the accusations against Binder, Mardini and other members of ERCI by Amnesty International
 2020 report on European restrictive, sanctioning and punitive measures against people who defend refugees and migrants’ rights. by Amnesty International

1996 births
Living people
Human rights activists
German activists
Sea rescue
Prisoners and detainees of Greece
Alumni of Trinity College Dublin
Alumni of the London School of Economics
People from County Kerry